WWE Crush Hour is a vehicular combat video game published by THQ and released in 2003 for the GameCube and PlayStation 2. An Xbox version was planned but cancelled.

Plot
The plot of the game consists of Vince McMahon ending up having control over all of the television networks, making WWE superstars feature on any TV show or commercial that he wants. His newest project, titled "Crush Hour", is a demolition derby-style show featuring over 30 of the WWE superstars in their own custom cars with guns on them (Primary Weapon), and foreign objects (Optional Weapon) to enhance the destruction of the opponent's vehicles, and a "Special Move" which will inflict significantly more damage than the other aforementioned weapons. WWE Crush Hour also features the audio commentary by Jim Ross.

Roster

Starters
 Big Show (Big Rig)
 Billy Gunn (Concept Car)
 Booker T (SUV-Pickup Truck Hybrid)
 Brock Lesnar (Armored Truck)
 Bubba Ray Dudley (Converted Pickup Truck)
 Chris Benoit (Modified ATV)
 Chris Jericho (Muscle Car)
 Chuck Palumbo (Concept Car)
 Edge (Futuristic Sports Car)
 Jeff Hardy (Wood-Paneled Station Wagon)
 Kane (Modified Muscle Car)
 Kurt Angle (Patriotic SUV)
 Matt Hardy (Wood-Paneled Station Wagon)
 Rikishi (Steamroller)
 Rob Van Dam (4-Wheel ATV)
 The Rock (Luxury Sports Car)
 Stacy Kiebler (Import Tuner)
 Steve Austin (Monster Truck)
 Test (Converted Pickup Truck)
 Triple H (Armored ATV)
 Trish Stratus (German Luxury Car)
 The Undertaker (3-Wheel Chopper)
 William Regal (British Roadster)

Unlockables
 Bradshaw (Armored Fire-Truck)
 Christian (Futuristic Sports Car)
 D-Von (Converted Pickup Truck)
 Hulk Hogan (Sports Car)
 Kevin Nash (Big Rig)
 Lita (Racing Car)
 Ric Flair (Sports Car)
 Stephanie McMahon (German Luxury Car)
 Vince McMahon (Super-Stretch Limousine)

Development
WWE Crush Hour was officially announced on May 16, 2002 by JAKKS Pacific and THQ. It was released on March 17, 2003 in North America, and on May 15 in Europe. The game was a budget title, and retailed for much less than other licensed games.

Reception

The game received "mixed or average" reviews on both platforms according to video game fans and also review aggregator Metacritic.

See also

 List of licensed wrestling video games
 List of vehicular combat games

References

External links

2003 video games
Cancelled Xbox games
GameCube games
PlayStation 2 games
THQ games
WWE video games
Multiplayer and single-player video games
Vehicular combat games
Professional wrestling games
Video games using Havok
RenderWare games
Video games developed in the United States